Dell Streak 5 (previously known as the Dell Mini 5) is a smartphone/tablet hybrid ("phablet") from Dell that uses the Android operating system.  It comes with a  capacitive touchscreen and two cameras, a 5MP one with dual-LED flash on the back and a VGA-resolution one on the front for video calling; both are capable of video. 
The development was first disclosed in June 2009 and in October 2009 it was known that the tablet was capable of making 3G phone calls.

The three buttons at the bottom (or right, when held in its normal landscape mode) are capacitive. The Android buttons used are Home, Menu, and Back.
It features a Dell skin on top and has a cradle adapter with HDMI out. The phone lacks the navigational trackball found in many previous Android devices. While FM radio support is not an official feature, an FM radio chip was found upon inspection of the Streak's internal hardware, and can be accessed though a user's modification of the OS. The versions released previously have had Android 1.6 installed, with Dell offering unlocked Streaks with Android 2.2 (Froyo) in December 2010. 

Customers on the British O2 mobile phone network were given the opportunity to install Android 2.1 in early September 2010 through an Over the Air update. This update, however, caused an uproar amongst consumers, over bugs and removal of some features from the previous software.

A seven-inch version of the Streak was announced at the Consumer Electronics Show in January 2011.  The Wall Street Journal reviewed it unfavorably in February. A long-rumored ten-inch model went on sale in August in China.

Following protests from users that Dell, by not including source code, had violated the terms of the GNU General Public License, the source code for the Dell Streak is now available for download.

There is a root method for the Dell Streak, and many roms are available, including iterations of the CyanogenMod ROM. These are available from the xda-developers website along with other ROMS.

Dell discontinued the Streak 5 on as of August 15, 2011. Customers attempting to purchase the device were directed to a "Good Bye, Streak 5" landing page. The larger Streak 7 was discontinued on December 2, 2011; Dell continues to sell a 10-inch tablet in China.

Reception
The Streak 7 received a tepid reaction from one reviewer due to its poor display and software bugs/glitches at launch. The Streak was considered bulky, and the Android 2.2 "Froyo" that it ran was geared more for smartphones instead of tablets. While almost all tablet computers released in 2011 had failed to gain much market share in the face of overwhelming demand for the Apple iPad 2, the Streak 7 compared poorly to other Android tablets such as the Samsung Galaxy Tab.

InfoWorld has suggested that Dell treated the Streak as a "Frankenphone business", where OEMs see tablets as a short-term, low-investment opportunity running Android OS, but this approach neglected the user interface and this failed to gain long term market traction with consumers.

Samsung Galaxy Note with 5.3 in AMOLED display was first released in Germany in late October 2011 and received positive reviews, but with exception that users would look "like a fool" if they held it to their face to take a call.

See also 
 Dell Axim
 Dell Venue
 Samsung Galaxy Note series

References

External links
 Engadget - Dell Mini 5: We Have It
 Tablet Leader - Dell Streak Full Review
 Dell Streak Community/Support forum
 GPL Source
 List of available ROMs at XDA formum (including official Korean update to Android 2.3.3 and link to custom ROM with 2.3.7+ releases)

Tablet computers
Smartphones
Android (operating system) devices
Dell products
Mobile phones introduced in 2010
Dell mobile phones
Phablets